The Facel Vega FV/FVS is a car produced by French automaker Facel from 1954 until 1959. It continued to be built until 1962 as the HK500.

History

FV
The Facel "Vega" was launched at the 1954 Paris Salon, although the first prototype had been completed in October 1953. Originally the model name was "Vega", but they gradually became "Facel Vega" with "FV" followed by a number indicating the iteration. By 1956, the cars were called FVS (for Facel Vega Sport) in the United States. The 1954 versions of the Facel were fitted with a DeSoto Firedome (Chrysler) 4.5 litre Hemi V8 engine, paired with either Chrysler's two-speed Powerflite automatic transmission or, at extra cost, a four-speed manual made by Pont-à-Mousson. The chassis, designed by Lance Macklin, was tubular framed, featuring coil springs and double wishbones at the front, with a leaf-sprung live rear axle. The styling, by Daninos himself, was somewhat American and perhaps a bit heavy, with rudimentary tail fins. The body was an expanded version of the earlier, Facel-bodied Simca/Ford Comète. An abundance of stainless steel brightwork was fitted.

The dashboard was aircraft-inspired, and one of the first to feature a middle console over the gearbox. On FV and FV1 models, the dashboard was entirely upholstered in leather. The rear seats folded flat to provide a luggage platform and additional access to the boot. The FV1 was also  longer than the original design47 of these early FVs were built in 1954 and 1955. Seven were convertibles, but as these suffered from rigidity troubles all but a handful of the rest of the large two-door Facels were pillarless coupés.

FVS
Introduced in October 1955, the FV2 featured a panoramic (aka wrap-around) windshield. The trompe-l'œil dashboard was metal, hand painted to look like burled wood by Marcel Bigot, the head of Facel's paint department. Referred to as the FVS in the United States, the car featured the same 4.8-litre engine as in the FV1, albeit now offering . One single FV2 convertible was built and exhibited at the company's stand at the 1955 Paris Salon, while two FV2B convertibles were built in 1956 for customers in the United States. One FV3 convertible was also finished, in spite of Daninos' reluctance to offer the bodystyle due to its lack of rigidity.

The FVS was also offered with a three-speed automatic, and front disc brakes were available from 1958. At some point a reworked, more harmonious front end was introduced for the FV3 model, featuring what looked like twin stacked headlights but what were actually headlamps on top and auxiliaries beneath. Power steering and power brakes were both standard as of 1957. As Plymouth replaced the 277 engine with the bigger-bore 301 for the 1957 model year, Facel did the same and called the resulting model the FV3B. In addition to the new  engine, the FV3B also received new, slightly longer and wider bodywork on cars built after the first batch of twelve cars had been completed in March 1957. In total, 357 FVs and FVSs were built.

A four-door version, called the Excellence, was added to the lineup in 1958, but was even more rarefied than the two-door version.

French publisher Michel Gallimard was driving his FV2 on January 4, 1960, when he lost control and crashed outside of Villeblevin. The crash killed him and one of his passengers, Nobel laureate Albert Camus. Some have speculated that the driver was not familiar with the car's handling and weight, and that contributed to the severity of the crash.

HK500

For 1959, the Facel Vega HK500 was introduced. Essentially, it was just a renamed, upgraded FVS. Equipped at first with the  5.8-litre V8 from the FVS, the HK500 soon received a  6.3 litre Chrysler V8, giving it a top speed of 147 mph (237 km/h). It could accelerate from 0-60 mph (97 km/h) in 8.5 seconds. Initially, disc brakes were optional, becoming standard in April, 1960. The Facel Vega II replaced the HK500 in 1962, after 489 had been built. One was a specially made convertible. Total FV/HK production was 842, or 846 depending on the source.

Notes

References

FV
Cars introduced in 1954
1960s cars
Grand tourers
Rear-wheel-drive vehicles